Kiprovo is a rural locality (a village) in Kargopolsky District, Arkhangelsk Oblast, Russia. The population was 206 as of 2010. There are 7 streets.

Geography 
Kiprovo is located 6 km north of Kargopol (the district's administrative centre) by road. Zalyazhye is the nearest rural locality.

References 

Rural localities in Kargopolsky District